The larger Kvernaland area is an amalgamation of villages in Rogaland county, Norway. The village is located along the north end of the lake Frøylandsvatnet.  The village is located in both the municipalities of Klepp and Time (and a very small part extends into Sandnes municipality as well).  The eastern part of the village (in Klepp) is also known as Orstad and the western part of the village (in Time) is known as Frøyland or simply as Kvernaland.  The village of Klepp stasjon lies just southwest of the village on the west side of the lake and the small village of Foss Eikjeland lies just north of the village, along the river Figgjo.
  
About  of the village is located in Klepp and that part has 4,058 residents. There are 3,267 residents in the  part located in Time. There is also a very small part of Kvernaland located in Sandnes municipality with 33 residents.

Kvernaland is home to several factories, mainly producing equipment for agriculture. The largest is Kverneland Group, the world's largest manufacturer of ploughing and agricultural equipment.  The Museum of the municipality of Time (Time Bygdemuseum) is also located in Kvernaland.  Their football club is called Frøyland IL.  The Øksnevadporten Station, located on the Jæren railway line, is located in Orstad.

Kvernaland is a parish in the Church of Norway.  It is unique in Norway in that the parish crosses municipal boundaries.  The Frøyland og Orstad Church is located in Orstad, but it serves the whole village.

References

Villages in Rogaland
Klepp
Time, Norway
Sandnes